Susan Lynn Williams (June 21, 1951 – April 24, 2018) was an American marine biologist and Distinguished Professor of Evolution and Ecology at the University of California, Davis, where she directed the Bodega Marine Laboratory from 2000-2010. She researched marine coastal ecosystems (in particular seagrass, seaweed, and coral reef habitats) and how they are affected by human activities. She was a strong advocate for environmental protection, credited with helping pass legislation expanding the boundaries of Northern California's Gulf of the Farallones and Cordell Bank national sanctuaries, increasing the area of federally-protected coastal waters.

Early life and education
Williams attended the University of Michigan, where she earned a bachelor's of science degree in biology in 1972. She then earned a master's degree in biological oceanography from the University of Alaska in 1977 and a doctoral degree in botany and marine biology from the University of Maryland in 1981.

Career
Williams served as science director of the United States National Oceanographic and Atmospheric Administration's National Undersea Research Program in the Virgin Islands before becoming a professor of biology at San Diego State University, where she directed the University's Coastal and Marine Institute.

Williams joined the faculty of the University of California, Davis in 2000 and served as director of the University's Bodega Marine Laboratory between 2000 and 2010. She returned to teaching full-time in 2010 and remained on the UC Davis faculty until her death from a traffic collision in Petaluma, California on April 24, 2018. She taught and mentored both undergraduate and graduate students, including teaching a course called "Life in the Sea" which she developed to help get non science-majors inspired to help protect marine environments.

Williams served as president of the Coastal and Estuarine Research Federation from 2009 to 2011.

Williams worked closely with Indonesian researchers throughout her career: in 2015, she co-authored a study that looked at the effects of human pollution on fish for sale in California and Indonesia. They found that a quarter of the fish from the California Bay Area they tested and an even greater proportion of the fish from Indonesian fish markets contained plastic debris or synthetic fibers. This was one of the first times plastic debris were reported in fish sold directly for human consumption.

Another study Williams performed in collaboration with Indonesian scientists looked into ways to restore seagrass beds, endangered habitats that are important for, among other things, supporting fisheries and protecting coastlines. Working in Indonesia's Coral Triangle, a biodiversity hotspot made up of seagrass, coral reefs, and mangrove forests, Williams and her colleagues showed that restoration efforts were more effective when they planted multiple species of seagrass instead of just a single species. These findings can help direct seagrass restoration efforts around the world.

In October 2017 and February 2018, Williams returned to Indonesia through the Fulbright Specialist Program; there she worked with faculty and students at Hasanuddin University to establish and expand upon existing infrastructure to protect Indonesia's coastal ecosystems.

Advocacy and community outreach

Williams encouraged scientists to engage meaningfully with the general public as well as with politicians. Her connection with political activism began early in her scientific career; in 1993, she was appointed to a panel of scientists consulting with the assistant secretary of the Interior, and in 2000 she received an Aldo Leopold Fellowship in Environmental Leadership. This activism continued to the end; mere weeks before her death she co-wrote an article commemorating the one-year anniversary of 2017's March for Science in which she urged scientists to become more engaged with the public and politicians.

In 2007, she testified before United States Congressional committees about how the Point Arena upwelling center off California's coast provides nutrients to help downstream marine productivity - this is credited with helping pass legislation in June 2015 extending the northern boundary of California's Greater Farallones National Marine Sanctuary in order to better protect the coastal environment.

Williams also used her scientific work to speak out about the dangers of climate change; in 2010, she helped raise the alarm that even small increases in ocean temperature could rapidly accelerate the growth of invasive species in marine environments.

Williams was remembered by colleagues as an effective mentor and strong advocate for women scientists. In 2009, UC Davis' Consortium for Women and Research named her an "outstanding mentor."

Awards
 Fellow of the California Academy of Sciences, 2003 
 Fellow of the American Association for the Advancement of Science, 2006
 Distinguished Scholarly Public Service Award, UC Davis Academic Senate, 2010
 Outstanding Mentor Award, UC Davis Consortium for Women and Research, 2009
 Outstanding Student in Oceanography, University of Alaska, 1977
 Outstanding Biology Faculty Member, San Diego State University, 1993
 Aldo Leopold Fellowship in Environmental Leadership, 2000
 Distinguished Service Award, Coastal and Estuarine Research Federation, 2013
 Outstanding Leadership Honor, Coastal and Estuarine Research Federation, 2011
 Fellow of the Japan Society for the Promotion of Science, 1997

Selected publications

]

References

External links
Williams Lab website
 
 

1951 births
2018 deaths
American marine biologists
University of California, Davis faculty
University of Michigan College of Literature, Science, and the Arts alumni
University of Alaska alumni
University System of Maryland alumni
Fellows of the American Association for the Advancement of Science
San Diego State University faculty
American women biologists
Road incident deaths in California
20th-century American biologists
20th-century American women scientists
21st-century biologists
21st-century American women scientists
21st-century American scientists